Nikola Grbić (2 February 1899 – 2 December 1973) was a Yugoslav wrestler. He competed in the Greco-Roman middleweight event at the 1924 Summer Olympics.

References

External links
 

1899 births
1973 deaths
Olympic wrestlers of Yugoslavia
Wrestlers at the 1924 Summer Olympics
Yugoslav male sport wrestlers